The Pullen Corner School is a historic schoolhouse located at Chase Farm in Lincoln, Rhode Island.  It is a small wood-frame structure with a gable roof, set on a granite foundation.  It is a single bay wide and two deep, with the interior divided between a small vestibule area and the single classroom.  The property also includes a woodshed and privy.  The schoolhouse was built c. 1840, and was one of the first schoolhouses built by the town.

The building was listed on the National Register of Historic Places in 1984.

See also
National Register of Historic Places listings in Providence County, Rhode Island

References

School buildings on the National Register of Historic Places in Rhode Island
Schools in Providence County, Rhode Island
Buildings and structures in Lincoln, Rhode Island
National Register of Historic Places in Providence County, Rhode Island